African American Museum may refer to:

African American Museum and Library at Oakland, California
African American Museum of the Arts, DeLand, Florida
African American Museum of Iowa
African American Museum of Nassau County, Hempstead, New York
The African American Museum in Cleveland, Ohio
African American Museum in Philadelphia, Pennsylvania
African American Museum (Dallas), Texas
National Museum of African American History and Culture, Washington, D.C.

See also
National Museum of African American History and Culture, a Smithsonian Institution museum
List of museums focused on African Americans